In the field of mathematical analysis, an interpolation space is a space which lies "in between" two other Banach spaces. The main applications are in Sobolev spaces, where spaces of functions that have a noninteger number of derivatives are interpolated from the spaces of functions with integer number of derivatives.

History
The theory of interpolation of vector spaces began by an observation of Józef Marcinkiewicz, later generalized and now known as the Riesz-Thorin theorem.

In the development of Sobolev spaces, it became clear that the trace spaces were not any of the usual function spaces (with integer number of derivatives), and Jacques-Louis Lions discovered that indeed these trace spaces were constituted of functions that have a noninteger degree of differentiability.

Many methods were designed to generate such spaces of functions, including the Fourier transform, complex interpolation, 
real interpolation, 
as well as other tools (see e.g. fractional derivative).

The setting of interpolation 
A Banach space  is said to be continuously embedded in a Hausdorff topological vector space  when  is a linear subspace of  such that the inclusion map from  into  is continuous. A compatible couple  of Banach spaces consists of two Banach spaces  and  that are continuously embedded in the same Hausdorff topological vector space . The embedding in a linear space  allows to consider the two linear subspaces

and

It depends in an essential way from the specific relative position that  and  occupy in a larger space .

Equipped with these norms, the intersection and the sum are Banach spaces. The following inclusions are all continuous:

where the two inclusions maps are continuous.

An example of this situation is the pair , where the two Banach spaces are continuously embedded in the space  of measurable functions on the real line, equipped with the topology of convergence in measure. More generally,

Definition.

The interpolation pair  is said to be of exponent  (with ) if there exists a constant  such that

for all operators  as above. If , we say that  is an exact interpolation pair of exponent .

Complex interpolation 
If the scalars are complex numbers, properties of complex analytic functions are used to define an interpolation space.

, 
, 
.

 is a Banach space under the norm

Definition. For , the complex interpolation space  is the linear subspace of  consisting of all values f(θ) when f varies in the preceding space of functions,

The norm on the complex interpolation space  is defined by

Equipped with this norm, the complex interpolation space  is a Banach space.

Theorem.

The family of  spaces (consisting of complex valued functions) behaves well under complex interpolation.

with equality of norms.  This fact is closely related to the Riesz–Thorin theorem.

Real interpolation 
There are two ways for introducing the real interpolation method. The first and most commonly used when actually identifying examples of interpolation spaces is the K-method. That the J- and K-methods agree is important for the study of duals of interpolation spaces: basically, the dual of an interpolation space constructed by the K-method appears to be a space constructed form the dual couple by the J-method; see below.

K-method 
The K-method of real interpolation can be used for Banach spaces over the field  of real numbers.

Definition. Let  be a compatible couple of Banach spaces. For  and every , let

Changing the order of the two spaces results in:

Let

The K-method of real interpolation consists in taking  to be the linear subspace of  consisting of all  such that .

Example 
An important example is that of the couple , where the functional  can be computed explicitly. The measure  is supposed -finite.

The optimal choice of  leads to the formula

J-method 
As with the K-method, the J-method can be used for real Banach spaces.

Definition. Let  be a compatible couple of Banach spaces. For  and for every vector , let 

A vector  in  belongs to the interpolation space  if and only if it can be written as

Relations between the interpolation methods 
The two real interpolation methods are equivalent when .

Theorem. Let  be a compatible couple of Banach spaces.

The theorem covers degenerate cases that have not been excluded: for example if  and  form a direct sum, then the intersection and the J-spaces are the null space, and a simple computation shows that the K-spaces are also null.

One has that

Theorem.

A complex interpolation space is usually not isomorphic to one of the spaces given by the real interpolation method. However, there is a general relationship.

Theorem. Let  be a compatible couple of Banach spaces. If , then

Examples 
This is because the K-functional  of this couple is equivalent to

Only values  are interesting here.

Real interpolation between  spaces gives the family of Lorentz spaces.

with equivalent norms. This follows from an inequality of Hardy and from the value given above of the K-functional for this compatible couple. When , the Lorentz space  is equal to weak-.

The reiteration theorem 
An intermediate space  of the compatible couple  is said to be of class θ if 

with continuous injections.

The reiteration theorems says, in essence, that interpolating with a parameter  behaves, in some way, like forming a convex combination : taking a further convex combination of two convex combinations gives another convex combination.

Theorem.

There is also a reiteration theorem for the complex method.

Theorem. Then, for every , 

Duality 
Let  be a compatible couple, and assume that  is dense in X0 and in X1. It follows that the pair of duals  is a compatible couple continuously embedded in the dual .

For the complex interpolation method, the following duality result holds:

Theorem.

In general, the dual of the space  is equal to  a space defined by a variant of the complex method. The upper-θ and lower-θ methods do not coincide in general, but they do if at least one of X0, X1 is a reflexive space.

For the real interpolation method, the duality holds provided that the parameter q is finite:

Theorem. Let  and  a compatible couple of real Banach spaces. Then  where

Discrete definitions 
Since the function  varies regularly (it is increasing, but  is decreasing), the definition of the -norm of a vector , previously given by an integral, is equivalent to a definition given by a series. This series is obtained by breaking  into pieces  of equal mass for the measure ,

The interpolation space  is a "diagonal subspace" of an -sum of a sequence of Banach spaces (each one being isomorphic to ).

The discrete definition makes several questions easier to study, among which the already mentioned identification of the dual. Other such questions are compactness or weak-compactness of linear operators. Lions and Peetre have proved that:Theorem.

Davis, Figiel, Johnson and Pełczyński have used interpolation in their proof of the following result:Theorem. A bounded linear operator between two Banach spaces is weakly compact if and only if it factors through a reflexive space.

 A general interpolation method 

The interpolation space  consists of the vectors  in  such that

This abstract method can be used, for example, for the proof of the following result:Theorem. A Banach space with unconditional basis is isomorphic to a complemented subspace of a space with symmetric basis.

 Interpolation of Sobolev and Besov spaces 
Several interpolation results are available for Sobolev spaces and Besov spaces on Rn,

These spaces are spaces of measurable functions on  when , and of tempered distributions on  when . For the rest of the section, the following setting and notation will be used:

Complex interpolation works well on the class of Sobolev spaces  (the Bessel potential spaces) as well as Besov spaces:

Real interpolation between Sobolev spaces may give Besov spaces, except when ,

When  but , real interpolation between Sobolev spaces gives a Besov space:

Also,

 See also 
 Riesz–Thorin theorem
 Marcinkiewicz interpolation theorem

 Notes 

 References 
.
.
.
.
Leoni, Giovanni (2017). A First Course in Sobolev Spaces: Second Edition. Graduate Studies in Mathematics. 181'. American Mathematical Society. pp. 734. .
.
.

Banach spaces
Fourier analysis
Sobolev spaces